Angela Lynette Aycock (born February 28, 1973), later known as Sister Paula, is an American former professional basketball player. She played for two seasons in the Women's National Basketball Association (WNBA) before retiring to a monastic life in 2002.

College career
Aycock was recruited in 1991 from Lincoln High School in Dallas, Texas to play college basketball for the University of Kansas (Kansas Jayhawks). At the time she was touted as the second-best player in the country by the Women's Basketball News Service, and was the USA Today and Dallas Morning News Texas Player of the Year.

In her sophomore year, she was named team captain. As a junior, she was the Big Eight Conference co-player of the year. In her senior year, she made several All-America teams. By the end of her college career she had scored 1,978 points for Jayhawks, the third highest total in the team's history.

She also turned out for the USA Women's U18 and U19 teams, in 1992 and 1993. Her U18 team won the silver medal at the COPABA Junior World Championship Qualifying Tournament in Guanajuato, Mexico.

Kansas statistics

Professional career
Early in her professional career, Aycock played two full seasons and part of a third for the Seattle Reign in the now-defunct American Basketball League. She also traveled overseas to compete in Italy, Greece, Spain, France and South Korea. In her short stint with the WNBA she saw game time with the Phoenix Mercury, the Minnesota Lynx and the Seattle Storm. Overall, she featured in 98 games for the ABL, and in 12 for the WNBA.

WNBA career statistics

Regular season

|-
| align="left" | 1999
| align="left" | Phoenix
| 8 || 0 || 3.8 || .000 || .000 || 1.000 || 0.1 || 0.4 || 0.3 || 0.0 || 0.8 || 0.5
|-
| align="left" | 2000
| align="left" | Seattle
| 1 || 0 || 7.0 || .000 || .000 || .000 || 2.0 || 0.0 || 0.0 || 0.0 || 0.0 || 0.0
|-
| align="left" | 2000
| align="left" | Minnesota
| 3 || 0 || 2.0 || .000 || .000 || .000 || 1.0 || 1.3 || 0.0 || 0.0 || 0.0 || 0.0
|-
| align="left" | Career
| align="left" | 2 years, 3 team
| 12 || 0 || 3.6 || .000 || .000 || 1.000 || 0.5 || 0.6 || 0.2 || 0.0 || 0.5 || 0.3

Post-basketball
In 2002, Aycock moved on from professional basketball to become a nun of the Russian Orthodox Church Outside Russia after converting to it, coming from a Baptist background. According to her sister, she was apparently introduced to the church during her time visiting various churches and cathedrals in Europe. She took the name Sister Paula, and was subsequently cloistered at the Protection of the Holy Virgin Mary Convent in Bluffton, Canada. In mid-2003 she transferred to another convent, the location of which is not known.

Other honors
In February 2003, Aycock made the journey from her Bluffton convent to the KU campus in Lawrence, Kansas to see her jersey (No. 12) retired. It remains the last time she has made a public appearance.

References

External links

SC Alcamo stats at FIBAEUROPE.com
Panathinaikos AC stats at FIBAEUROPE.com 
Profile at jayhawks.org

1973 births
Living people
African-American basketball players
African-American Christians
All-American college women's basketball players
21st-century American nuns
American expatriate basketball people in France
American expatriate basketball people in Greece
American expatriate basketball people in Italy
American expatriate basketball people in South Korea
American expatriate basketball people in Spain
American expatriates in Canada
American women's basketball players
Basketball players from Dallas
Christians from Texas
Converts to Eastern Orthodoxy from Protestantism
21st-century Eastern Orthodox nuns
Former Baptists
Forwards (basketball)
Guards (basketball)
Kansas Jayhawks women's basketball players
Minnesota Lynx players
Phoenix Mercury players
Russian Orthodox Christians from the United States
Seattle Reign (basketball) players
Seattle Storm players
21st-century African-American sportspeople
21st-century African-American women
20th-century African-American sportspeople
20th-century African-American women
20th-century African-American people